Mads Justesen (born 31 December 1982) is a former Danish professional footballer who played for Danish Superliga side Hobro IK as a defender.

Career
Justesen had a part-time job as upper secondary school teacher, due to Hobro's limited success in Danish football. However, the club reached the Danish Superliga after a great 2013–14 Danish 1st Division campaign, where the small club reached promotion after a goal by Justesen against Brønshøj BK. Justesen was one of the players who helped Hobro with promotion from the Danish fourth tier to the Danish Superliga. 

After 14 years at Hobro, Justesen announced that he would retire at the end of the 2017-18 season but continue at the club as a Sales Manager. On 4 March 2019 Hobro confirmed, that Justesen had decided to step back from the position.

References

External links

Profile on Hobro IK website

1982 births
Living people
Danish men's footballers
Hobro IK players
Danish Superliga players
Danish 1st Division players
Danish 2nd Division players
Association football central defenders